Denha (Syriac script ܕܢܚܐ, denḥa) is the classical Syriac word for an epiphany, and may refer to:

Epiphany
Epiphany (holiday)
Epiphany season

People
Denha and its variant Dinkha may refer to:
Denha I of Tikrit, Syriac Orthodox Grand Metropolitan of the East from 649 to 659
Denha I, Patriarch of the Church of the East from 1265 to 1281
Denha II, Patriarch of the Church of the East from  1336 to  1382
Shimun XIII Dinkha Patriarch of the Assyrian Church of the East from 1681 to  1700
Dinkha IV, Patriarch of the Assyrian Church of the East from 1976 to 2015